Brooklands Museum is a motoring and aviation museum occupying part of the former Brooklands motor-racing track in Weybridge, Surrey, England.

Formally opened in 1991, the museum is operated by the independent Brooklands Museum Trust Ltd, a private limited company (No.02109945) and a registered UK charity (No.296661); its aim is to conserve, protect and interpret the unique heritage of the Brooklands site.

History of Brooklands

Brooklands was the birthplace of British motorsport and aviation and the site of many engineering and technological achievements throughout eight decades of the 20th century. The racing circuit was constructed by local landowner Hugh F. Locke King in 1907 and was the first purpose-built racing circuit in the world. Many records were set there. Many aviation firsts are also associated with Brooklands, which soon became one of Britain's first aerodromes. It attracted many aviation pioneers prior to World War I, and was also a leading aircraft design and manufacturing centre in the 20th century, producing a remarkable total of some 18,600 new aircraft of nearly 260 types between 1908 and 1987 (see McSwein, D R).

Brooklands-based aircraft companies such as Bleriot, Hawker, Sopwith, Martinsyde, and Vickers were key players in the early years of aviation and were crucial to its early development. The 'Daily Mail Round Britain Air Race' of 1911 started and finished at Brooklands, and both the event and the location later influenced the theme of the classic 1965 Twentieth Century Fox British film comedy Those Magnificent Men in Their Flying Machines.

Flying training was an important function of the aerodrome both before World War I and between the wars. Visitors can see many displays and exhibits portraying the contribution made by Brooklands to the British aircraft industry in both world wars, and also in the post-war years with Vickers and later the British Aircraft Corporation and British Aerospace.

Vickers purchased the site in 1946 for £330,000, which allowed them to produce civilian aircraft. The most notable of these was the Vickers Viscount, of which 444 were built between Brooklands and Bournemouth. In 1959, the Vanguard was test flown from Brooklands. In 1962, the test flight for the prototype VC10 also took place at Brooklands, and subsequently all 53 production VC10s were flown out as well before being completed and test flown at Wisley.

Museum history

Events leading to the establishment of the Museum

Outbreak of World War II 
The last race meeting ever held at Brooklands took place on 7 August 1939. On 3 September 1939 Britain declared war on Germany and the remaining scheduled motor racing and motorcycling meetings were cancelled. Brooklands, under the control of the Ministry of Aircraft Production, was turned over exclusively to aircraft production for the duration of the War, Vickers continuing to produce Wellington bombers and Hawker assembling its Hurricane fighters at their respective facilities, with some of the smaller engineering companies located at Brooklands also taking on war contracts.

Aftermath of War 
Six years of war, including several air raids, and the expansion of aircraft production across the site, had caused a great deal of damage to the Brooklands track.

The British Government was also in favour of extending the use of the site for aircraft production and early in 1946 implied that the choice for the owner of the property, Brooklands (Weybridge) Limited, was either to sell the land or wait for it to be compulsorily purchased. A sale to Vickers-Armstrongs Ltd for £330,000 was duly completed on 1 July 1946.

Jubilee events and foundation of the Brooklands Society 
On 6 July 1957 the Brooklands Memorial was unveiled by Lord Brabazon of Tara, at an event organised by Vickers-Armstrongs to mark the 50th anniversary of the opening of Brooklands motor course. June 1967 saw a rally take place on the site, organised by Godalming & District Round Table, marking the track's diamond jubilee.

The latter event was a catalyst for the formation of the Brooklands Society, whose objects were to promote interest in Brooklands (for both its motoring and aviation influences) and to preserve what remained of the track and infrastructure.

In 1977, Weybridge Museum held a temporary exhibition on the site, 'Wings over Brooklands', curated by Morag Barton and supported by (among others) British Aerospace Weybridge and the Brooklands Society. The same year, the Brooklands Society obtained outline planning consent for a museum on a 40-acre portion of the site, but lacked the funds to acquire the land and pursue its plans. Nevertheless, Society members worked hard throughout this time to clear the track of the trees, vegetation and debris that had been allowed to build up since the track closed in 1939.

Acquisition of the site and opening of the Museum 
In 1982, the 40-acre site was bought by a tobacco company, Gallaher Ltd, which retained 10 acres for an office building but, in 1984, leased the remaining 30 acres to Elmbridge Borough Council for the purpose of founding a museum.  Restoration of the Clubhouse and part of the track on the site began and Brooklands Museum Trust Ltd was incorporated on 12 March 1987, with Sir Peter Masefield as chairman and Morag Barton as the first Museum Director. In April 1989 Prince Michael of Kent became Royal Patron. The Museum was formally opened in 1991.

In the 2002 New Year's Honours List, Morag Barton was made a MBE in recognition of her services to the Brooklands Museum Trust.

Museum site 

It includes four Listed buildings: the 1907 Brooklands Automobile Racing Club Clubhouse and Members' Hill Restaurant buildings, the 1911 Flight Ticket Office, and a 1940 Bellman aircraft hangar.
Surviving sections of the 1937 Campbell Circuit, the 1907 Finishing Straight and Members' Banking (the steepest section of the former racing circuit), the 1909 Test Hill, and a WW2 'Bofors' gun tower are all important parts of the Brooklands Scheduled Monument which was extended in 2002. The entire Brooklands site was designated a Conservation Area by Surrey County Council in 1989.

Collection

The museum is open daily and displays a wide range of Brooklands-related motoring and aviation exhibits ranging from giant racing cars such as the 24-litre Napier-Railton, motorcycles, and bicycles to a unique collection of Hawker and Vickers/British Aircraft Corporation-built aircraft including Concorde (G-BBDG). 

Other museum exhibits include flyable Bleriot XI and Sopwith Camel replicas built by Mike Beach and Viv Bellamy, respectively. The Camel is maintained in 'live' condition and performs regular engine running demonstrations at museum events during the year. A Grand Prix motor racing exhibition which features a Formula One simulator can also be seen. A major new visitor attraction, 'The Concorde Experience', opened in August 2006, centenary celebrations occurred in 2007 and a full-size modern working replica of Alliott Verdon Roe's 1908 'Avroplane' was completed and unveiled on 7 June 2008.

The museum also owns and, until late 2009, operated an airworthy Vickers Vimy replica which was built in America in 1994 to re-enact the design's three record-breaking long distance flights of 1919–20. Having helped commemorate the 90th anniversaries of the world's first Transatlantic flight and the first flight from England to Australia, the aeroplane was finally retired and flown into Brooklands on 15 November 2009.

Less than a week later it was on display with a supporting exhibition in the museum's main hangar and in 2016 it was relocated to a purpose-built Vimy Pavilion where it is now kept maintained 'live' condition and performs occasional engine running demonstrations on the nearby Race Track.

In early 2011 the museum received (on loan from its owners) the historic fuselage of the Supermarine Swift F.4 prototype, WK198, which held the World Absolute Air Speed Record when flown by test pilot Mike Lithgow in Libya on 26 September 1953.

The museum celebrated the centenary of the opening of the Brooklands Circuit in 2007, 100 years of aviation at Brooklands in 2008 and the Test Hill's centenary in 2009. Centred on a restored Hawker Hurricane, a temporary exhibition about Brooklands in the Battle of Britain was unveiled on 15 September 2010 and explained how the aircraft factories here made the site a prime target for the Luftwaffe in 1940 and listed the names of almost 90 people killed when Vickers was badly bombed on 4 September and also the names of Luftwaffe aircrew casualties that day. Another new temporary exhibition about the Vickers Wellington was centred on the Loch Ness Wellington and was opened by Robin Holmes, Penelope Keith, Norman Parker and Ken Wallis on 15 June 2011 – the 75th anniversary of the first flight of the type's forerunner, prototype Vickers B.9/32.

In 2012, a significant Brooklands aviation anniversary – 50 years of the Vickers VC10 airliner – was marked by the staging of a VC10 Symposium and the official opening of a new VC10 exhibition by the late Sir George Edwards' daughter Angela Newton on 29 June – half a century after this remarkable aeroplane was first flown here by Jock Bryce, Brian Trubshaw and Bill Cairns.

On the evening of 29 September 2012, with help from museum volunteers, contractors moved the ex-British Airways/Heathrow Airport 40% scale Concorde model G-CONC to a new location at the south end of Brooklands Drive, where it now marks the main entrance to Brooklands Museum.

The Brooklands contribution to the Royal Air Force's legendary 617 Squadron 'Dambusters' attack on Germany's Ruhr Valley reservoirs on 16–17 May 1943 was commemorated on 12 May 2013 by three impressive flypasts of Brooklands Museum given by the RAF Battle of Britain Memorial Flight's Avro Lancaster – as a special 70th anniversary tribute to Barnes Wallis and the Vickers-Armstrongs design and experimental department engineers who made the 'Upkeep' mine such a successful weapon.

The museum's aviation exhibits include a 1914 Sopwith Schneider floatplane replica, built by volunteers at Brooklands and funded by the Kingston Aviation Heritage Trust who donated it to the museum on 27 November 2013 and a 1961 BAC/Hunting Percival Jet Provost T.3A which arrived on loan from nearby Brooklands College on 22 May 2014. Prototype Beagle 206X G-ARRM recently returned to Brooklands for the first time since 1994 having been loaned to Farnborough Aviation Museum from 2011 to 2017.

In February 2015, the museum secured a £4.681 million grant from the Heritage Lottery Fund towards a £7 million Brooklands Aircraft Factory and Race-Track Revival Project. This major scheme involved dismantling, fully restoring and relocating the 1940 Bellman Hangar away from the Race Track, building an adjacent two-storey Flight Shed with stores and workshop on the ground floor and restoring the north end of Finishing Straight. The latter was completed in time for the 110th anniversary of the Track opening in June 2017 and the rest of the project was finished and officially opened as the Brooklands Aircraft Factory by Prince Michael of Kent on 13 November 2017.

Supporters' organisation 
The Brooklands Trust Members, formed in 2008 after the Friends of Brooklands Museum and the Brooklands Club amalgamated, is the official supporters' organisation for the museum.

London Bus Museum

In August 2011, the new London Bus Museum opened in new premises on land at Brooklands Museum. Formerly the private Cobham Bus Museum from 1972 to 2011, LBM is itself an Accredited Museum (provisional), displaying some 35 historic London buses dating back to the 1870s, together with associated artefacts, and is run by the London Bus Preservation Trust, a Registered Charity. Entry to London Bus Museum is on a joint ticket with Brooklands Museum with one admission charge covering both museums.

See also
List of aerospace museums
List of automotive museums
List of transport museums
List of museums in Surrey

References

Bibliography
Gardner, Charles (1956) 'Fifty Years of Brooklands' (William Heinemann Ltd)
McSwein, D R (1993) 'Brooklands Aircraft' (unpublished paper – copy held in Brooklands Museum's library)
Venables, David (2007) 'Brooklands – The Official Centenary History' (Haynes Publishing)

External links

Brooklands Museum
Brooklands Trust Members

Brooklands
Motorcycle museums in the United Kingdom
Automobile museums in England
Museums in Surrey
Aerospace museums in England
Local museums in Surrey
Museums established in 1987
1987 establishments in England